Bianchi, a plural of bianco ("white" in Italian), is an Italian surname. Notable people with the surname include:

Achille Bianchi (1837–?), Italian sculptor
Al Bianchi (1932–2019), American professional basketball player, coach, and general manager
Andrea Bianchi (1925–2013), Italian film director
Beto Bianchi (born 1966), Brazilian footballer
Bianca Bianchi (1855–1947), stage name of Bertha Schwarz, German/Austrian opera soprano
Bruno Bianchi (disambiguation), several people
Carlos Bianchi (born 1949), former Argentine football (soccer) player and coach
Craig Bianchi (born 1978), South African soccer player
Daniela Bianchi (born 1942), actress
Edoardo Bianchi (1865–1946), founder of Bianchi Bicycles in 1885
Eliodoro Bianchi (1773–1848), Italian operatic tenor
Emilio Bianchi (born 1957), Italian radio and TV journalist
Emanuele Bianchi (born 1984), Italian footballer
Eugenio Bianchi (born 1979), Italian physicist
Francesco Bianchi (painter) (1447–1510), Renaissance painter
Francesco Bianchi (composer) (1752–1810), operatic composer
Frederick Bianchi, Duke of Casalanza (1768–1855), Austrian general
Frederick Bianchi (born 1954), American-born composer
Gerardo Bianchi (c. 1223–1302), Italian churchman
Giuseppe Bianchi (disambiguation), several people
 (1845–1884), Italian explorer of Ethiopia
Jeff Bianchi (born 1986), American baseball player
Joe Bianchi (1871–1949), Italian-American artisan
Jules Bianchi (1989–2015), French racing driver, great-nephew of Lucien Bianchi
Kenneth Bianchi (born 1951), American serial killer
Leonardo Bianchi (1848–1927), Italian neuropathologist
Leonardo Bianchi (footballer) (born 1992), Italian footballer
Lucien Bianchi (1934–1969), Italian-born Belgian racing driver, great-uncle of Jules Bianchi
Luigi Bianchi (1856–1928), Italian mathematician
Luigi Alberto Bianchi (1945–2018), Italian violinist and violist
Marius Bianchi (1823–1904), French politician
Marta Bianchi (born 1943), Argentinian actress
Maurizio Bianchi (born 1955), Italian musician
Michael A. Bianchi, columnist for the Orlando Sentinel
Michele Bianchi (1883–1930), founding member of the Italian Fascism movement
Olga Bianchi (1924–2015), Latin American pacifist and human rights activist
Ottavio Bianchi (born 1943), former coach for a number of Serie A teams
Patrizio Bianchi (born 1952), Italian economist and politician
Regina Bianchi (1921–2013), Italian actress
Rolando Bianchi (born 1983), Italian footballer
Rosa María Bianchi (born 1948), Argentine-born Mexican actress
Suzanne M. Bianchi (1952–2013), American sociologist
Tom Bianchi (born 1945), American photographer
Valentin Lvovich Bianchi (1857–1920), Russian ornithologist
Vitaly Bianki (1894–1959), Russian children's writer, son of Valentin Lvovich Bianchi

Fictional characters
Dora Bianchi and Sven Bianchi, characters in the webcomic Questionable Content

References

Italian-language surnames

cs:Bianchi
es:Bianchi
fr:Bianchi
nl:Bianchi
ja:ビアンキ (曖昧さ回避)
pl:Bianchi
pt:Bianchi
ru:Бианки
scn:Bianchi